Nam Gon (147110 March 1527) was a Korean politician, poet, Neo-Confucian scholar, thinker, writer and Prime Minister during the Joseon Dynasty. His nicknames were Jijeong (지정, 止亭), Jijokdang (지족당, 知足堂) and Jijok (지족, 知足), while his courtesy name was Sahwa (사화, 士華). He was also a member of the Sarim faction.

Family
Parents
Father: Nam Chi-shin (남치신)
 Grandfather: Nam Gyu (남규, 南珪)
 Grandmother: Lady Park of the Miryang Park clan (밀양 박씨)
Mother: Lady Ha of the Jinju Ha clan (진주 하씨)
 Grandfather: Ha Bi (하비, 河備)
Sibling(s)
 Older brother: Nam Po (남포, 南褒) (1459 - 1540)
 Sister-in-law: Lady Jeong (정씨, 鄭氏)
 Nephew: Nam Jeong-jin (남정진, 南廷縉)
Wives and their children
Lady Yi of the Yeonan Yi clan (정경부인 연안 이씨); daughter of Yi Se-eung (이세웅, 李世雄)
1st daughter: Lady Nam of the Uiryeong Nam clan (의령 남씨)
 Son-in-law: Yi Seon (이선, 李墠); Yi Saek’s 5th great-grandson
2nd daughter: Lady Nam of the Uiryeong Nam clan (의령 남씨) (1492 - ?)
 Son-in-law: Song Ji-han (송지한, 宋之翰)
 Grandson: Song In (송인, 宋寅) (31 January 1517 - 18 August 1584)
 Granddaughter-in-law: Yi Jeong-hwan (이정환, 李貞環), Princess Jeongsun (정순옹주) (18 December 1517 - 22 September 1581); King Jungjong’s daughter 
 Great-Grandson: Song Yu-ui (송유의, 宋惟毅)
 Adoptive Great-Grandson: Song Yu-rang (송유랑, 宋惟良)
 Adoptive Great-Grandson: Song Yu-sun (송유순, 宋惟純)
3rd daughter: Lady Nam of the Uiryeong Nam clan (의령 남씨)
 Son-in-law: Yu Chung-gyeong (유충경, 柳忠慶)
Unnamed concubine
4th daughter: Lady Nam of the Uiryeong Nam clan (의령 남씨)
 Son-in-law: Shin Dae-yun (신대윤, 愼大胤)
 Grandson: Shin Ik (신익, 愼益)
1st son: Nam Seung-sa  (남승사, 南承嗣)
Concubine: Lady Joun (조운) – a gisaeng

Life
Nam was a Korean Neo-Confucian scholar of the Youngnam school and teacher of Kim Jong-jik. He was the Joseon Dynasty's Vice Prime Minister until 1520, and then Prime Minister from 1523 to 1527. Nam Gon studied under Neo-Confucian scholar Kim Jong-jik. He was an ideological and political rival of Jo Gwang-jo. Jo studied under his friend Kim Kwaeng-pil.

Works
 Jijeongjip (지정집, 止亭集)
 Yujagwangjeon (유자광전, 柳子光傳)
 Namakchangsurok (남악창수록, 南岳唱酬錄)

References

남곤은 밀양인 이였다! - 밀양신문

See also
List of Korean philosophers
Neo-Confucianism
Kim Jong-jik
Jo Gwang-jo

External links

Nam Gon 
Nam Gon 
Nam Gon 
남곤은 밀양인 이였다! - 밀양신문 

Korean diplomats
16th-century Korean philosophers
Korean Confucianists
Korean educators
Neo-Confucian scholars
Korean scholars
1471 births
1527 deaths
16th-century Korean poets
Korean male poets
Uiryeong Nam clan
16th-century Korean calligraphers